The Clover Fire was a fatal wildfire in Shasta County, California. It burned from September 9 to September 15, 2013 in an area near the communities of Happy Valley and Igo, California, about 10 miles southwest of Redding. Damages were estimated at $65 million. One man has been charged with arson in the case.

Fire history
The fire was named for its origin near Cloverdale Road. It started around 12:30 PM on September 9 and spread quickly due to strong winds and dry conditions. The fire spread so fast that some residents were given just minutes to evacuate. The fire was fully contained on September 15.

Brian Stanley Henry, age 55, a resident of Igo who formerly worked as a California Department of Forestry firefighter and timber faller, died in the fire.

Investigation
Zane Peterson, a 29-year-old resident of Happy Valley was arrested in December 2013 and charged with 71 counts, including arson and murder. He is accused of starting the two separate fires which merged into the Clover Fire. He is also charged with setting six other wildfires between September and November 2013. The suspect previously worked for seven years (2005-2012) for the U.S. Forest Service as a firefighter and fire engine driver. He has entered a plea of "Not Guilty".

References

2013 California wildfires
Wildfires in Shasta County, California
California wildfires caused by arson